The Moncton Miracles were a Canadian professional basketball team in Moncton, New Brunswick. Established in 2011, they were a charter member of the National Basketball League of Canada (NBL). The Miracles played their home games at the Moncton Coliseum as a part of the league's Atlantic Division and were one of two New Brunswick teams in the league along with the Saint John Riptide. The team was founded and owned by Steven Conville but were now without an owner for three seasons. Their seasons in the NBL Canada had been highlighted by struggles, until the franchise was finally folded following the 2016–17 season when a new ownership decided to start a new franchise in Moncton called the Moncton Magic.

History 
The Miracles were founded in 2011 and made their debut in the 2011–12 season of the NBL (National Basketball League). The team was primarily established by Steven George Conville;Steven Conville, who was the vice president and portfolio manager for Macquarie Private Wealth, part of the  Macquarie Group, at the time. A big basketball fan, Conville accepted an offer to start a professional team by Andre Levingston, who would be the co-founder of the NBL Canada.

Following a failure to establish an NBL Canada team based out of Kingston, Ontario, Conville decided to create one in Moncton. He targeted the city because of its rapid growth and tight-knit community. Despite not having visited the city before becoming the Miracles' owner, Conville gained a perspective of Atlantic Canada during business trips to Halifax, Nova Scotia and Prince Edward Island. He said, "So when I did my research on Moncton, I found out how much they loved basketball out there." At a press conference in August 2011, Conville was officially named team owner. He also announced his hiring of Norris "Bo" Bell as the first head coach for the Miracles. Bell ran a basketball academy in Atlanta, Georgia in the United States. A former player, he also had experience in the Continental Basketball Association (CBA) and in France and Switzerland. Bell faced the likes of Micheal Ray Richardson, Dražen Petrović, and Billy Knight during his playing career. He also became fluent in French through his years in Europe, which was part of the reason he drew Conville's attention.

The Miracles' nickname was inspired by the term Moncton Miracle, which referred to the city of Moncton's comeback from recession in the 1980s. Conville described it by saying that it "connects with Moncton's history and symbolizes the strength, courage and toughness that this city has shown over the years." The nickname was also chosen because "Miracle" is the same word in both French and English. Conville also commented on the team's logo, "Our team logo is meant to embody the strength that comes through when you rise above... the player in the logo carrying the ball is not wallowing in the past. He's heading towards the future and he's doing it ferociously."

After three seasons of operations under the league management and without an owner, the NBL Canada sold a new franchise to three local business to play as the Moncton Magic.

Final roster

Season-by-season record

References

External links
 

 
Sport in Moncton
Basketball teams in New Brunswick
Basketball teams established in 2011
2011 establishments in New Brunswick
Defunct National Basketball League of Canada teams
2017 disestablishments in New Brunswick
Basketball teams disestablished in 2017